The following is a timeline of the history of Pietermaritzburg. It is part of the Msunduzi Local Municipality in the Umgungundlovu District Municipality, KwaZulu-Natal province, South Africa.

19th century

 1839
 Pietermaritzburg founded by Voortrekkers; named after Gerrit Maritz and Piet Retief.
 October: Settlement becomes capital of the newly formed Natalia Republic.
 1840 - Voortrekker Church of the Vow consecrated.
 1843
 British  established.
 Natalier newspaper begins publication.
 Settlement becomes capital of the newly formed British Colony of Natal.
 1846
 Natal Witness newspaper begins publication.
 Book Society founded.
 1847 - Natal Independent newspaper begins publication.
 1851
 Natal and East African Society and Agricultural Society founded.
 In vicinity of Pietermaritzburg, development of Edendale begins.
 1856
 Pietermaritzburg incorporated as a borough.
 D. D. Buchanan becomes mayor.
 Pietermaritzburg officials issue "ordinance permitting the establishment of African locations" (i.e. racial segregation).
 1862 - Prison built on Burger Street.
 1863 - Mr. William Calder opens High School Maritzburg, later to become Maritzburg College, or, simply "College."
 1868 
 William Macrorie becomes bishop of Anglican diocese of Maritzburg.
 St Saviour's Cathedral, Pietermaritzburg opened.
 1874 - Botanical Garden established.
 1878 - February: Natal Society Museum opens.
 1879 - Pietermaritzburg County Football Club formed.
 1880 - Durban-Pietermaritzburg railway begins operating.
 1885 - Pietermaritzburg Chamber of Commerce active (approximate date).
 1888 - Alexandra Park established.
 1893 - 7 June: Civil rights activist Gandhi removed from train in Pietermaritzburg for defying racial segregation law.
 1897 - St. John's Diocesan School for Girls founded.

20th century
 1901 - Town Hall rebuilt.
 1904
 Electric tram begins operating.
 Natal Government Museum active.
 Population: 31,119.
 1910
 Natal University College founded.
 Pietermaritzburg becomes part of the newly formed Union of South Africa (British dominion).
 1911 - Population: 30,555.
 1912 - Voortrekker museum founded.
 1919 - Fort Napier becomes a hospital.
 1920 - Pietermaritzburg Girls' High School founded.
 1921 - Comrades Marathon (Durban-Pietermaritzburg) begins.
 1924 - Beer hall in business on Pietermaritz Street.
 1925 - Shuter & Shooter Publishers in business.
 1927 - Afrikaansmediumskool (school) established.
 1929 - "Native Village at Sobantu" built.
 1931 - Natal Bantu Football Association formed.
 1934 - Nux student newspaper begins publication.
 1944 - Pietermaritzburg Italian P.O.W. Church built on Epworth Road.
 1948 - Alexandra Park Street Circuit (motor race track) opens.
 1951 - Dusi Canoe Marathon to Durban begins.
 1953 - Roy Hesketh Circuit (motor race track) opens.
 1954 - Edendale Hospital founded.
 1960 - Alexandra High School for white boys opens.
 1961 - Pietermaritzburg becomes part of the newly independent Republic of South Africa.
 1962 - Statue of Piet Retief unveiled.
 1972 - 6 April: "In the Natal Supreme Court in Pietermaritzburg, at the end of the longest trial of its kind in South Africa, thirteen defendants...are sentenced...for contravening the Terrorism Act."
 1979 - Maritzburg United F.C. (football club) formed.
 1976 - St Saviour's Cathedral, Pietermaritzburg deconsecrated and demolished in 1981.
 1981 - Anglican Cathedral of the Holy Nativity consecrated.
 1985 - 5 August: Treason trial begins.
 1987 - September: Flood.
 1989 - Napierville prison begins operating.
 1990 - March: "Seven Day War" occurs.
 1991 - Population: 156,473 city; 228,549 metro.
 1993
 April: Unrest.
 6 June: Gandhi memorial unveiled.
 1996 - Children in Distress Network (CINDI) organized.
 2000
 Pietermaritzburg becomes part of the newly formed Msunduzi Local Municipality (which includes Edendale, Imbali, etc.).
 Hloni Glenford Zondi becomes mayor.

21st century
 2001 - Population: 223,519.
 2002 - Pietermaritzburg Chamber of Business formed.
 2004 - University of Natal becomes University of KwaZulu-Natal.
 2005 - Website Msunduzi.gov.za launched (approximate date).
 2006 - Zanele Hlatshwayo becomes mayor of Msunduzi.
 2010 - May: Mike Tarr becomes mayor of Msunduzi.
 2011 - Chris Ndlela becomes mayor of Msunduzi.
 2013 - Spring Grove Dam at Mooi River begins operating in vicinity of city.
 2016 - Themba Njilo becomes mayor of Msunduzi.
 2021 - 2021 Pietermaritzburg power outage
 2022 - 2022 Pietermaritzburg shooting

See also
 Pietermaritzburg history
 List of mayors of Pietermaritzburg
 List of heritage sites in Pietermaritzburg
 List of Governors of Natal (British colony), headquartered in Pietermaritzburg 1843–1910
 Timelines of other cities in South Africa: Cape Town, Durban, Johannesburg, Port Elizabeth, Pretoria

References

Bibliography

 
  + Street Directory
  (About Pietermaritzburg, with illustrations)
 
 
 
 
 
  (About Pietermaritzburg)
 
 Matthew Kentridge. An Unofficial War: Inside the Conflict in Pietermaritzburg (Cape Town: David Philip 1990)

External links

  (Directory of South African archival and memory institutions and organisations)
  (Bibliography)
  (Articles, images etc.)
 Items related to Pietermaritzburg, various dates (via Europeana)
 Items related to Pietermaritzburg, various dates (via Digital Public Library of America)

Timeline
South African timelines
Timelines of cities in Africa